Van Cortlandtville School, also known as Common School District No. 10, is a historic school building located at Van Cortlandtville, Westchester County, New York. It was built about 1850 and is a small, one story, brick vernacular Gothic Revival style building.  It has a steeply pitched, slate covered gable roof and board and batten siding.  Additions were made to the original building in the early 20th century and in 1940.  The building serves as headquarters of the Van Cortlandtville Historical Society.

It was added to the National Register of Historic Places in 1989.

See also
National Register of Historic Places listings in northern Westchester County, New York

References

External links
Van Cortlandtville Historical Society website

History museums in New York (state)
School buildings on the National Register of Historic Places in New York (state)
Gothic Revival architecture in New York (state)
School buildings completed in 1850
Schools in Westchester County, New York
National Register of Historic Places in Westchester County, New York